KOZN (1620 AM) is a sports station licensed to Bellevue, Nebraska and serving the Omaha metropolitan area. It is owned by NRG Media, headquartered in Cedar Rapids, Iowa, with studios located at Dodge Street and 50th Avenue in Midtown Omaha, and a transmitter site at Bellevue, Nebraska. KOZN also streams most of its programming on its website.

Programming

KOZN is an independent station, with programming from Fox Sports Radio, Compass Media Networks and Westwood One Radio Networks. The station has local programming Monday through Friday from 6:00 a.m. to 6:00 p.m., with "Gary and Friends," with Gary Sharp, from 6:00am to 10:00 a.m., The Connor Happer Show from 10:00 to 2:00 p.m., and Unsportsmanlike Conduct, hosted by John Bishop and Josh Peterson, from 2:00 p.m. to 6:00 p.m. Other local shows include After Hours" hosted by Jimmie Allen and Rob Luv;The Creighton Athletics Hour hosted by Ravi Lulla, "Severe Reaction" with Mike'l Severe, and pre and postgame shows for Nebraska football and Creighton basketball. The station is also the radio home for Creighton Men's and Women's Basketball.

KOZN carries Creighton University Basketball and Baseball, Westwood One NFL Football and NCAA Basketball and University of Nebraska-Omaha Basketball. KOZN originates and produces all game broadcasts of the NCAA Men's College World Series, held each June in Omaha, and distributed nationally by Westwood One. Play by play is provided by eight-time Nebraska Sportscaster of the Year Kevin Kugler.

History

KOZN originated as the expanded band "twin" of an existing station on the standard AM band. On March 17, 1997 the Federal Communications Commission (FCC) announced that eighty-eight stations had been given permission to move to newly available "Expanded Band" transmitting frequencies, ranging from 1610 to 1700 kHz, with KOIL (now KZOT) in Bellevue authorized to move from 1180 to 1620 kHz. An application to construct the expanded band station, also located in Bellevue, was filed by Mitchell Broadcasting on June 16, 1997, which was assigned the call letters KAZP on January 9, 1998. This station began operating in September 1999. The call letters were changed to KOZN on October 3, 2001.

The FCC's initial policy was that both the original station and its expanded band counterpart could operate simultaneously for up to five years, after which owners would have to turn in one of the two licenses, depending on whether they preferred the new assignment or elected to remain on the original frequency. However, this deadline has been extended multiple times, and broadcasting on both 1180 and 1620 kHz has remained authorized. One restriction is that the FCC has generally required paired original and expanded band stations to remain under common ownership.

The original morning team of John Desjardins and Mike Steele, aka "Louie & The Animal" was called The Cage. It was replaced by the Bruno-Golic Morning Show when the station debuted the ESPN Radio full-time lineup. Unsportsmanlike Conduct began with Kevin Kugler and Bob Bruce in 2000, and has been on the air continually since. As of February 1, 2011, 1620 The Zone discontinued its affiliation with ESPN Radio.

References

External links
Official website

Sports radio stations in the United States
OZN
Radio stations established in 2011
Fox Sports Radio stations
NRG Media radio stations